Vetukuri Venkata Siva Rama Raju, also known as Kalavapudi Siva, is an Indian politician and ex member of Andhra Pradesh Legislative Assembly representing Telugu Desam Party (TDP) from Undi (his Assembly constituency).

Biography

Political career
In 2009 he was elected as a representative from the Undi constituency in the 2009 Andhra Pradesh Legislative Assembly election with 42.07% of the votes, a majority of 15,568 votes. He ran again in the 2014 general elections and was elected to the Andhra Pradesh assembly from the Undi constituency with a vote share of  58.21% and a majority of 36,231 votes, one of the highest majorities in the 2014 Andhra Pradesh general elections. In  2019 General elections he contested  from Narasapuram Lok Sabha constituency and get defeated  by Kanumuru Raghu Rama Krishna Raju  with  margin of 3% votes.

Personal life
Vetukuri Venkata Siva Rama Raju was born on 10 May 1970 in a small village of Kalavapudi in the West Godavari district of Andhra Pradesh. Siva attended primary and secondary schooling in Eluru at St. Xavier’s High school graduating in 1984. He went to Bhimavaram for his higher education and completed his intermediate education at Kasturibhai Government Junior College. He received his Bachelor of Commerce Degree from Dantuluri Natrayana Raju College (D.N.R. College - Andhra University) Bhimavaram, in 1989.

He is an active director of VEM Technologies Private Limited which operates in assembly and systems integration for aerospace and defense systems.

Awards
Vetukuri Venkata Sivarama Raju was awarded the Bharatiya Chaatra Samsad Foundation, Pune’s Adarsh Yuva Vidhayak Puraskar. Bharatiya Chaatra Samsad Foundation has invited Mr. Raju to address its sixth annual convention. According to a press release, Mr. Raju had organised installation of 78 RO water plants in 70 villages. Under Neeru-Chettu programme, nearly 30,000 tree guards were provided. The significant initiative is distribution of seed packets with 17 types of seed to 70,000 families.

Political Statistics

References

Andhra Pradesh MLAs 2009–2014
Andhra Pradesh MLAs 2014–2019
Telugu Desam Party politicians
1970 births
Living people